The Fighting Redhead  is a 1949 American Western film directed by Lewis D. Collins and starring Jim Bannon as Red Ryder in the final film of the series. The film was shot at the Iverson Movie Ranch.

Plot
Red Ryder, Buckskin, the Duchess and Little Beaver go to the help of an old rancher who has been threatened by the gang of a crooked saloon keeper. They run into his revenge-seeking daughter who's quick on the draw.

Cast
 Jim Bannon as Red Ryder
 Don Reynolds as Little Beaver (as Little Brown Jug)
 Emmett Lynn as Buckskin
 Marin Sais as Duchess 
 Peggy Stewart as Sheila O'Connor
 John Hart as Faro Savage 
 Lane Bradford as Henchman Windy
 Forrest Taylor as Dan O'Connor 
 Lee Roberts as Henchman Goldie Grant
 Bob Duncan as Sheriff
 Sandy Sanders as Ranch Hand Joe
 Billy Hammond as Bill Evans
 Spooky Reynolds as Mary - Joe's Daughter (as 'Spooky' Reynolds)

See also
 List of American films of 1949

References

External links

1949 films
1940s English-language films
1949 Western (genre) films
Eagle-Lion Films films
Cinecolor films
American Western (genre) films
Films directed by Lewis D. Collins
1940s American films
Red Ryder films